, often abbreviated as , is a public, coeducational, university preparatory high school in Morioka city, Iwate, Japan. Founded in 1880, Morioka Ichikō is the second oldest high school in Iwate prefecture and one of the oldest in Japan. As of March 2008, it has 939 enrolled students.

Its logo stands for pine needles; each needle represents truth, virtue, and a heart of gold.

Motto

Courses
General Course, full-time
Science and Mathematics Course, full-time

Club activities
Kyūdō, kendo, baseball, football, judo, swimming, skiing, tennis, soft tennis, table tennis, climbing, basketball, badminton, volleyball, handball, rugby, track and field, softball, igo, shogi, drama, chorus, chemistry, sadō, kadō, photography, calligraphy, newspaper, wind orchestra, biology, astronomy, fine arts, geography, literature, amateur radio, anime, simulation, dance

Student activities
cheering, broadcasting, annual bulletin, student government

Access
 18-minute walk from Morioka Station
 5-minute walk from Kami-Morioka Station

Academic calendar
April
Freshman Orientation
Cheering Practice
Entrance ceremony
May
Athletic Festival
June
Ball Game Festival
July
Cheering Practice (specifically for High school baseball in Japan)
September
School Festival
December
School excursion
February
Farewell party
Cheering Practice
March
Graduation ceremony

See also
Iwate Prefectural Board of Education
List of high schools in Japan

References

External links
  

High schools in Iwate Prefecture
Schools in Iwate Prefecture
Educational institutions established in 1880
1880 establishments in Japan
Morioka, Iwate